Villeneuvia is a genus of true flies, belonging to the family Muscidae. There is only one known species. They are very similar to Limnophora, but orbital seta are absent in both sexes.

It is a coastal fly found throughout most of coastal Europe.

Species
Villeneuvia aestuum (Villeneuve, 1902)

References

External links
 D'Assis Fonseca, E.C.M, 1968 Diptera Cyclorrhapha Calyptrata: Muscidae Handbooks for the Identification of British Insects pdf
 Seguy, E. (1923) Diptères Anthomyides. Paris: Éditions Faune de France Faune n° 6 393 p., 813 fig.Bibliotheque Virtuelle Numerique  pdf

Muscidae genera
Muscomorph flies of Europe